Gorgunak (also Romanized as Gorgūnak) is a village in Nazil Rural District, Nukabad District, Khash County, Sistan and Baluchestan Province, Iran. At the 2006 census, its population was 43, in 9 families.

References 

Populated places in Khash County